Unconventional warfare (UW) is broadly defined as "military and quasi-military operations other than conventional warfare" and may use covert forces, subversion, or guerrilla warfare. This is typically done to avoid escalation into conventional warfare as well as international conventions.

Description

Aside from the earlier definition of warfare that is not conventional, unconventional warfare has also been described as:
 

There is another type of warfare— new in its intensity, ancient in its origin—war by guerrillas, subversives, insurgents, assassins; war by ambush instead of by combat, by infiltration instead of aggression, seeking victory by eroding and exhausting the enemy instead of engaging him. It preys on unrest.

Methods and organization

Unconventional warfare targets the civilian population psychologically to win hearts and minds, and only targets military and political bodies for that purpose, seeking to render the military proficiency of the enemy irrelevant. Limited conventional warfare tactics can be used unconventionally to demonstrate might and power, rather than to reduce the enemy's ability to fight substantially. In addition to the surgical application of traditional weapons, other armaments that specifically target the military can be used are: airstrikes, nuclear weapons, incendiary devices, or other such weapons. 

Special Forces, inserted deep behind enemy lines, are used unconventionally to train, equip, and advise locals who oppose their government. They can also spread subversion and propaganda, while they aid native resistance fighters, to ultimately cause a hostile government to capitulate. Tactics focus on destroying military targets while avoiding damage to civilian infrastructure and blockading military resupply are used to decrease the morale of government forces.

The USA Department of Defense defines unconventional warfare as activities conducted to enable a resistance movement or insurgency to coerce, disrupt, or overthrow a government or occupying power by operating through or with an underground, auxiliary, and guerrilla force in a denied area.

History
The advent of the Atomic Age changed forever philosophies of conventional warfare, and the necessity to conceal authorship of actions by hostile states. The age of asymmetric, or unconventional warfare & terrorism had begun.

One of the first references is in "Manpower and Atomic War,"  which Edward Fitzpatrick referred to as "the next kind of war- technological war, machine war, or atomic war." 

Using soft power methods, to target civilians instead of military units, however had begun earlier, particularly as a strategy for use against Republics. These were developed as a tool of national socialism, or neo-liberalism, and evolved into other doctrines.

There is an overlap in the world of Corporate Security & Defense Contracting where these models have extended to the field of Risk assessment. One of the first instances of Unconventional Warfare techniques against civilians was documented by the La Follette Committee.

See also
 Asymmetric warfare
 Gerasimov Doctrine
 Hybrid warfare
 Fourth generation warfare
 Irregular military
 Irregular warfare
 Low intensity conflict
 Partisan (military)
 Political warfare
 Psychological warfare
 Resistance movement
 Terrorism
 Counterintelligence
 Unrestricted Warfare
 Full-spectrum dominance
 A seminal work on unconventional stay-behind warfare is Major Hans von Dach's Der Totale Widerstand (Total Resistance).
 Six-legged Soldiers - A scientific warfare book on another potential form of unconventional warfare, by Jeffrey A. Lockwood

US & NATO specific:
 Operation Gladio
 Project Eldest Son
 Reagan Doctrine
 Special Activities Division
 U.S. Army Special Forces
 Ranger Regiment (United Kingdom)

References

External links

 Insurgency Research Group – Multi-expert blog dedicated to the study of insurgency and the development of counter-insurgency policy.
 Allied war terminology (File #5a)
 goarmy.com/special_forces/unconventional_warfare
 Unconventional Warfare: Definitions from 1950 to the Present 
 Unconventional Warfare: A Better Path to Regime Change in the Twenty First Century
 Instruments of Statecraft: U.S. Guerrilla Warfare, Counterinsurgency, and Counterterrorism, 1940–1990
 Pentagon plans cyber-insect army

Warfare by type